Najimuddaula is a Jatiya Party (Ershad) politician and the former Member of Parliament of Kurigram-4.

Career
Najimuddaula was elected to parliament from Kurigram-4 as a Jatiya Party candidate in 1986 and 1988.

References

Jatiya Party politicians
3rd Jatiya Sangsad members
4th Jatiya Sangsad members
Year of death unknown
Year of birth missing